Ishmael Welsh-Elliott (born 4 September 1987) is an English professional footballer who plays as a winger for Cray Wanderers.

Career
Welsh began his career as a trainee with West Ham United, turning professional in July 2005. He failed to break into the first team with West Ham and was released in May 2006. In July that year he signed a two-year contract with Yeovil Town and scored on his league debut on 12 August 2006 in Yeovil's 2–1 win at home to Carlisle United.

Despite being in Yeovil's first team at the start of the season, Welsh struggled to establish himself and was allowed to join Weymouth on loan in March 2007. He returned to Yeovil before the end of the season, playing in the final league game of the season away to Gillingham, but failed to make the squad for any of Yeovil's play-off matches.

In August 2007, Welsh joined Torquay United on a season-long loan. On 11 November Torquay met Yeovil in the first round of the FA Cup and Yeovil demanded that Torquay not include Welsh in the team to face them otherwise they would recall the midfielder back from his loan spell in January. Despite Yeovil's warning Torquay included him on the bench for the match but he was not brought on during the game as Torquay came away with a 4–1 win. After his spell at Torquay he returned to Yeovil, but was then quickly loaned back out, this time to Jim Harvey's Forest Green Rovers for the remainder of the 2007–08 season.

On 7 May 2008, Grays Athletic announced that Welsh had signed for the Essex outfit. In August 2010, Welsh left Ebbsfleet, having spent the previous season with them.

Welsh rejoined Isthmian League Division One North club Grays Athletic in August 2010.

In January 2011, Welsh signed up with his old manager, Tim O'Shea at Lewes in the Conference South.

In February 2012, Welsh joined Chelmsford City. Welsh was released by the Clarets on 5 February 2013 and promptly joined league rivals Bromley. He made his debut in a 1–1 home draw with Boreham Wood on 16 February. He left the club at the end of the season following the expiry of his contract.

After taking a season out from football, Welsh signed for Cray Wanderers ahead of the 2014–15 season.

now retired he works at preston park primary as a coach.

Honours

Club
Bromley
London Senior Cup (1): 2012–13

References

External links

1987 births
English footballers
Living people
Footballers from Deptford
West Ham United F.C. players
Yeovil Town F.C. players
Weymouth F.C. players
Torquay United F.C. players
Forest Green Rovers F.C. players
Grays Athletic F.C. players
Ebbsfleet United F.C. players
Lewes F.C. players
Chelmsford City F.C. players
Bromley F.C. players
English Football League players
National League (English football) players
Isthmian League players
Association football midfielders
England semi-pro international footballers
Cray Wanderers F.C. players